Aladikkadu is a village in the Pattukkottai taluk of Thanjavur district, Tamil Nadu, India.

Demographics 

As per the 2001 census, Aladikkadu had a total population of 777 with 389 males and 388 females. The sex ratio was 997. The literacy rate was 65.89.

References 

 

Villages in Thanjavur district